Harihara (or Harisvara) was a noted Kannada poet and writer in the 12th century. A native of Halebidu in modern Hassan district, he came from a family of accountants (Karnikas) and initially served in that capacity in the court of Hoysala King Narasimha I (r.1152–1173 CE). Later, he moved to Hampi and authored many landmark classics. Among his important writings, the Girijakalyana written in champu metre (mixed prose-verse) is considered one of the enduring classics of Kannada language.

Famous writings

Magnum opus
Harihara, although one of the earliest Veerashaiva writers, was not part of the famous Vachana literary tradition. He wrote under the patronage of King Narasimha I. He wrote his magnum opus, the Girijakalyana ("Marriage of the mountain born Goddess") in the Kalidasa tradition, though employing the old Jain champu style, with the story leading to the marriage of God Shiva and his consort Parvati in ten sections. Harihara brings out his ability for narration while describing the lamentation of Rati for Kama, and the intense love and devotion of Parvati for Shiva.

Though known for his magnum opus, his poetic talent found complete expression in his lyrical and narrative ragale poems. It was Harihara who popularised the ragale (couplets in blank verse), a metre native to Kannada language. In a deviation from the norm of the day, Harihara avoided glorifying famous mortals and continued the Jain tradition of "glorifying the spirit" and the "conquest of evil within oneself". So against eulogising earthly mortals was Harihara, legend has it that he physically abused his protégé Raghavanka for writing about King Harishchandra in the work Harishchandra Kavya (c. 1200).

Other poetic works
Shivaganada ragale
Harihara is credited with a collection of more than one hundred poems in the ragale metre called the Nambiyanana ragale (also called Shivaganada ragale or Saranacharitamanasa–"The holy lake of the lives of the devotees", c. 1160) after the saint Nambiyana. In this writing, which is a eulogy of the 63 saints of early Shaivism (devotion to God Shiva), of the later social reformers such as Basavanna, Allama Prabhu and Akka Mahadevi, and of God Virupaksha (a form of Hindu god Shiva), Harihara express emotions as few poets could. Referenced in this writing is the Tamil epic Periyapuranam.

Basavarajadevara ragale
Another important writing (though partially available), in the ragale metre is the Basavarajadevara ragale. It is on the life of Basavanna emphasizing the protagonist's compassion for devotees of the god Shiva. This work is the earliest biography of Basavanna from which 13 out of 25 sections are available and are considered important because the author was a near contemporary of his protagonist and set the trend for future biographers. Harihara thus became the earliest poetic biographer in the Kannada language. Interesting details of Basavanna's life are narrated by Harihara, some of which contradict commonly held beliefs. The author, who does not appear to be personally acquainted with his protagonist, mixed facts with some mythological details. While popular theory holds that Basavanna left his native place over a difference of opinion with his father regarding the brahminical initiation ritual (the "sacred thread ceremony"), Harihara's account states Basavanna lost his parents early in life and was cared for by his grandmother. Later he discarded his thread and left for Sangama, indicating he was already initiated. Regarding Basavanna's employment under King Bijjala II, while popular theory holds that Basavanna succeeded his deceased maternal uncle (whose daughter he was married to) as the treasurer of the king, according to Harihara, Basavanna's introduction to the king was made by the incumbent treasurer Sidhdandadhisa, whom he later succeeded to the post.

Mudigeya Ashtaka

Mudigeya ashtaka (1200) is an important ashtaka poem (an eight line verse metre) by Harihara. Legend has it that once when Harihara bowed down in prayer to his God (Shiva), the "Rudraksha" flowers in his headgear (a mudige) fell on the floor. Seeing this, the devotees who had gathered there derided Harihara for wearing the headgear. In response, Harihara composed the ashtaka extempore in honor of his deity and included a challenging phrase "I have laid the mudige on the floor, let me see who can pick it up".

Other writings

Harihara's other works include Pushpa ragale, Marichanana ragale  and Pampa sataka (written in the shataka metre comprising a string of 100 verses), in praise of the god Virupaksha of Hampi. For his poetic talent, he has earned the honorific "poet of exuberance" (utsava kavi).

Notes

References

12th-century births
13th-century deaths
Kannada poets
History of Karnataka
People from Hassan
Indian male poets
12th-century Indian poets
13th-century Indian poets